Prairiewood is a suburb of Sydney, in the state of New South Wales, Australia 34 kilometres west of the Sydney central business district, in the local government area of the City of Fairfield. It is part of the Greater Western Sydney region.

Prairiewood is primarily a residential suburb that is also home to a golf course, Fairfield Showground, schools, a leisure centre and a major shopping centre.

History
Prairiewood was once a part of Wetherill Park. The area was subdivided and developed in the 1970s as Prairiewood Estate. It later became a suburb and took on the name of the estate.

Commercial areas
Stockland Wetherill Park is a major shopping centre that is actually located in the north-western corner of Prairiewood. Fairfield Hospital moved to Prairiewood in 1988 from its original location in Fairfield.

Culture and recreation
Fairfield Golf Course is an 18-hole course. Fairfield Showground is home to many cultural celebrations and the Fairfield Markets, which are a common attraction every Saturday morning.

Population
The most common countries of birth were Iraq 15.5%, Vietnam 6.7%, Italy 3.2%, Syria 3.2% and Croatia 2.3%.

The most common ancestries were Assyrian 14.9%, Italian 10.3%, Vietnamese 9.0%, Chinese 8.9% and Australian 8.8%.

28.6% of people only spoke English at home. Other languages spoken at home included Assyrian (13.7%), Vietnamese (9.9%), Arabic (8.7%), Arabic (8.7%), Chaldean (6.2%), and Spanish (4.7%).

The most common responses for religion were Catholic 41.6%, No Religion 10.3%, Buddhism 10.0%, and Assyrian Apostolic 9.7%.

References

Suburbs of Sydney
City of Fairfield